Lone Oak Township is one of twenty-four townships in Bates County, Missouri, and is part of the Kansas City metropolitan area within the USA.  As of the 2000 census, its population was 293.

The township takes its name from Lone Oak Branch creek.

Geography
According to the United States Census Bureau, Lone Oak Township covers an area of 35.96 square miles (93.15 square kilometers); of this, 35.94 square miles (93.08 square kilometers, 99.92 percent) is land and 0.03 square miles (0.07 square kilometers, 0.08 percent) is water.

Unincorporated towns
 Athol at 
 Monteith Junction at 
 Peru at 
(This list is based on USGS data and may include former settlements.)

Adjacent townships
 Mount Pleasant Township (north)
 Summit Township (northeast)
 Pleasant Gap Township (east)
 Prairie Township (southeast)
 Osage Township (southwest)
 New Home Township (west)

Cemeteries
The township contains Fairview Cemetery.

Major highways
  U.S. Route 71
  Missouri Route 52

School districts
 Butler R-V School District
 Rich Hill R-IV

Political districts
 Missouri's 4th congressional district
 State House District 125
 State Senate District 31

References
 United States Census Bureau 2008 TIGER/Line Shapefiles
 United States Board on Geographic Names (GNIS)
 United States National Atlas

External links
 US-Counties.com
 City-Data.com

Townships in Bates County, Missouri
Townships in Missouri